Knebelite is a manganese variety of the fayalite-tephroite series with formula . It forms dark green orthorhombic crystals. It is reported from a variety of locations in Sweden as well as South Africa, Russia, British Columbia, New Hampshire, and Rhode Island.

References

Manganese(II) minerals
Iron(II) minerals
Nesosilicates